Farrell McElgunn (5 January 1932 – 2 March 2020) was an Irish Fianna Fáil politician and teacher. 

He completed a Bachelor of Arts in University College Galway in Irish and History, and later completed a masters of Irish in St Patrick's College, Maynooth. He was also a local historian. He taught in the Rosary High School, Presentation Brothers and Marymount College in Carrick-on-Shannon where he was vice-principal.

He was nominated by the Taoiseach to the 11th Seanad on 21 November 1968. He stood as a Fianna Fáil candidate at the 1969 general election for the Roscommon–Leitrim constituency but was unsuccessful. He was re-nominated by the Taoiseach to the 12th Seanad following the 1969 election. He served as a member of the first Irish delegation as a Member of the European Parliament from January to March 1973. He stood again at the 1973 general election for Roscommon–Leitrim but was again unsuccessful.

McElgunn died on 2 March 2020, aged 88.

References

External links
European Parliament office in Ireland – Irish MEPs: 1973–1979

1932 births
2020 deaths
Fianna Fáil senators
Politicians from County Leitrim
Members of the 11th Seanad
Members of the 12th Seanad
Fianna Fáil MEPs
MEPs for the Republic of Ireland 1973
Alumni of the University of Galway
Alumni of St Patrick's College, Maynooth
Nominated members of Seanad Éireann
People from Carrick-on-Shannon